Adrian Lee (born 27 December 1966 in Auckland, New Zealand) is an Australian actor. He is best known for playing Craig 'C.J' Jones on E Street  (1990–1992) and Joel Ritchie on Pacific Drive in 1996. Other TV appearances include The Flying Doctors, Family and Friends, and Brides of Christ. Lee also guest starred in Home and Away in 1995 as Andrew Warren. In 2001 he had a guest stint on All Saints. Lee is also a musician and a competent guitar player.

References

Australian male television actors
Living people
1966 births
People from Auckland